Serena and Venus Williams defeated Lisa Raymond and Samantha Stosur in the final, 6–2, 6–2 to win the ladies' doubles tennis title at the 2008 Wimbledon Championships. It was their third Wimbledon title together and seventh major title together overall, and they won the title without dropping a set. The Williams sisters played against each other in the singles final as well, in which Venus emerged victorious.

Cara Black and Liezel Huber were the defending champions but lost in the semifinals to Raymond and Stosur.

Seeds

  Cara Black /  Liezel Huber (semifinals)
  Ai Sugiyama /  Katarina Srebotnik (second round)
  Květa Peschke /  Rennae Stubbs (third round)
  Chan Yung-jan /  Chuang Chia-jung (first round)
  Anabel Medina Garrigues /  Virginia Ruano Pascual (third round)
  Victoria Azarenka /  Shahar Pe'er (quarterfinals)
  Alona Bondarenko /  Kateryna Bondarenko (withdrew)
  Peng Shuai /  Sun Tiantian (first round)

  Yan Zi /  Zheng Jie (third round)
  Dinara Safina /  Ágnes Szávay (third round)
  Serena Williams /  Venus Williams (champions)
  Svetlana Kuznetsova /  Amélie Mauresmo (withdrew)
  Bethanie Mattek /  Sania Mirza (quarterfinals)
  Alicia Molik /  Mara Santangelo (first round)
  Iveta Benešová /  Janette Husárová (second round)
  Lisa Raymond /  Samantha Stosur (final)

Qualifying

Draw

Finals

Top half

Section 1

Section 2

Bottom half

Section 3

Section 4

References

External links

2008 Wimbledon Championships on WTAtennis.com
2008 Wimbledon Championships – Women's draws and results at the International Tennis Federation

Women's Doubles
Wimbledon Championship by year – Women's doubles
Wimbledon Championships
Wimbledon Championships